Civil  conscription is the obligation of civilians to perform mandatory labour for the government. This kind of work has to correspond with the exceptions in international agreements, otherwise it could fall under the category of unfree labour. There are two basic kinds of civil conscriptions. 
On the one hand, a compulsory service can be ordered on a temporary basis during wartimes and other times of emergency, like severe economic crisis or extraordinary natural events to provide basic services to the population. These include, but are not limited to, medical care, food supplies, defense industry supplies or cleanup efforts, following a severe weather or environmental disaster for the duration of the emergency. Therefore, it generally makes striking illegal for the duration of the civil mobilization.
On the other hand, a revolving mandatory service may be required for a longer period of time, for example, to ensure community fire protection or to carry out infrastructure work at a local or community level.

Legal situation

Civil conscription is an exception of the Forced Labour Convention of 1930 of the International Labour Organization (ILO) and therefore unfree labour shall not include:
any work or service exacted in virtue of compulsory military service laws for work of a purely military character;
any work or service which forms part of the normal civic obligations of the citizens of a fully self-governing country;
any work or service exacted from any person as a consequence of a conviction in a court of law, provided that the said work or service is carried out under the supervision and control of a public authority and that the said person is not hired to or placed at the disposal of private individuals, companies or associations (requiring that prison farms no longer do convict leasing);
any work or service exacted in cases of emergency, that is to say, in the event of war, of a calamity or threatened calamity, such as fire, flood, famine, earthquake, violent epidemic or epizootic diseases, invasion by: animal, insect or vegetable pests, and in general any circumstance that would endanger the existence or the well-being of the whole or part of the population;
minor communal services of a kind which, being performed by the members of the community in the direct interest of the said community, can therefore be considered as normal civic obligations incumbent upon the members of the community, provided that the members of the community or their direct representatives shall have the right to be consulted in regard to the need for such services.

Types of civil conscription

The civil conscription services can be classified into three basic types:

Civil conscription due to extraordinary events
In times of extraordinary events, such as in times of war, in economic crisis, in the event of natural disasters or during the occurrence of epidemics or pandemics, a civil duty may be established to perform the tasks deemed necessary by the government for a certain period of time, to ensure the restoration of former status quo. These important tasks include the basic supply of the population, such as medical care, food supply, the defense industry for the duration of the war or a state of emergency, and the removal of damage to the infrastructure after severe weather or environmental disasters.

Civilian conscription for the benefit of the community
A government can order a civil service duty to be performed repetitive for a longer period of time, for example to ensure the fire protection of a municipality or to carry out simple work at the municipal level, that smaller municipalities are unable to do financially or due to lack of manpower.

Civilian duty to strengthen "national values"
Some countries have implemented a compulsory service for younger age groups or educational groups to convey "national values" and to strengthen national cohesion, which in part has to be done in military,  social or school-like institutions.

Present-day civil conscription

Austria
In Austria in addition to the current mandatory military service for male citizens in the Austrian Armed Forces and the legally connected alternative civilian services, citizens can be conscripted to perform following services:
 Compulsory fire service: By state´s legislations, in Carinthia, Salzburg, Tyrol and Vorarlberg, male citizens can be conscripted by a municipality to serve in a fire brigade. In the 19th century and at the beginning of the 20th century, the majority of fire brigades were compulsory for male citizens in Austria, in fact since decades no compulsory fire brigades was orderded by a municipality.
 Hand and hitch-up services: In Vorarlberg by state legislation, (mainly male) citizens can be obliged by municipalities to provide hand and hitch-up services. If a citizen does not fulfill this mandatory service, an additional tax must be paid.

France
 Code général des collectivités territoriales
According to article L2215-1 of the Code général des collectivités territoriales (General Law of Local Authorities), the prefect of a department may take measures for the municipalities of the respective department to maintain public order, as well as for the prevention of danger in general and for health protection in general. Among other regulations, this law allows to conscript system-preserving professional groups to provide essential services. In 2022, oil refinery workers were required to take up work during a strike to ensure the supply of fuel.

 État d'urgence sanitaire
During a sanitary state of emergency it is possible to draft personnel of necessary professional groups to combat a health disaster, like during the COVID-19 pandemic in France.

 Journée Défense et Citoyenneté
In 1998, the Journée Défense et Citoyenneté (JDC), the "Defence and Citizenship Day", was established by the French President, Jacques Chirac, after suspending the conscription for the military service. It is a one-day program that deals with citizenship, Duty of Remembrance, awareness on defence, army, nation, European issues etc.

 Service national universel
In 2019, President Emmanuel Macron introduced a compulsory service, the Service national universel (SNU), the "General National Service", which will be mandatory for all citizens aged 16–25 within the next century. It lasts for one month, the service can be done in both civilian and military institutions. The aim of this general civil conscription is to communicate French values, to strengthen social cohesion and to promote social engagement.

Germany
 Federal level
In Germany during a "State of Defence" male citizens could be drafted for the military service in the Bundeswehr or for a mandatory service in the border guard, although conscription is suspended for peacetime. Beside this during the state of defense the constitution allows civil conscription as well, female citizens between the ages of 18 and 55 could be called to perform medical duties, male citizens could be drafted for a service in a civil protection force. If required, the freedom to practice one's profession may be limited. During the state of defense the Federal Employment Agency (BA) receives special powers to order (unemployed) persons to jobs, that cannot be ensured on a voluntary basis. The conscripted persons can be used in following assignments:
 in the Bundeswehr
 Federal authorities
 State authorities
 Municipal authorities
 in civil defense units
 Electricity and water supply companies
 Waste and wastewater disposal companies
 in hospitals
 in nursing homes
 Oil refineries
 Transport companies and shipping lines
 Successor companies of the former Deutsche Bundespost, like the Deutsche Post AG, Deutsche Postbank and Deutsche Telekom
 at the Deutsche Flugsicherung, the German air traffic control

 State level
Depending on the respective state's legislations and in addition to the - in theory possible - mandatory civil service obligations at the federal legislation level, there are three more civil conscription services possible, that allow communities to draft citizens:
 the Compulsory Fire Service, which in fact is in force in a handful of communities, 
 the Dyke Relief Service, the draft of citizens by communities in the case of floodings and crevasse, and
 the Hand and hitch-up services, which is still enforced in small communities to maintain their infrastructure

 Political discussions and proposals
From time to time there are proposals for civil conscription of all citizens for general (social) services, that are considered to be legally problematic and could violate not only international agreements and the regulations of the German constitution as well, without a constitutional amendment. Those proposals are the establishment of a Soziales Pflichtjahr (German for "obligatory year of social service") or Bürgerarbeit (German for "citizens´ work"), a workfare-style draft for unemployed persons. In 2020, during the COVID-19 pandemic in Germany the state governments of Lower Saxony and North Rhine-Westphalia planned to establish a compulsory service for doctors and medical staff in the event of an epidemic and the legislative proposals were already in preparation. However, after protests by medical associations and other interest groups, the plans were ceased.

Ghana 
In Ghana, students who graduate from accredited university are required by law to do a one-year national service to the country. The National Service Secretariat (NSS) is the Government of Ghana agency mandated to formulate policies and structures for national service. The mandatory civilian service can be fulfilled in youth programs, agriculture, health and local government institutions. There is currently no military conscription in Ghana.

Israel 
In 1967, in connection with the Six-Day War, the Israeli Knesset passed the "Emergency Labor Service Act" to ensure the supply of essential goods and military equipment. In 1997 and 2020 in the wake of the COVID-19 pandemic, the law was repeatedly adapted. In the event of a crisis and the implementation of the "Emergency Labor Service Act", the law obliges every resident of Israel, with the exception of police officers, soldiers, pregnant women and mothers of babies, to a compulsory labor service in "essential companies". These essential companies are relevant to the security of the country or are maintaining basic services, such as electricity , water supply, communication and food supply. Employees must appear on time and can be transferred to other offices anytime.

Nigeria 
In Nigeria, there is no military conscription, but since 1973 graduates of Nigerian universities and polytechnics are required to serve in the mandatory National Youth Service Corps (NYSC). The Nigerian government wants to involve Nigerian graduates in nation building and the development of the country. The compulsory service lasts one year and graduates are ineligible for employment in governmental establishments (and most private establishments) until they have completed the mandatory service or obtained the relevant exemptions.

Rwanda
Umuganda is a national holiday in Rwanda taking place on the last Saturday of every month for mandatory nationwide community work from 08:00 to 11:00. Participation in umuganda is required by law, and failure to participate can result in a fine. The program was most recently re-established in 2009, and has resulted in notable improvement in the cleanliness of Rwanda.

Spain
During an estado de alarma, the "state of alarm", the Spanish government can impose civil conscription. This duty may extend to all or part of the national territory and to selective professional groups in the event of one of the following serious disturbances of normality:

 in case of serious risk, disaster or public accidents, such as earthquakes, floods, city and forest fires or serious accidents
 during health crises, such as epidemics, heavy pollution and environment disasters
 in case of shortage of basic necessities
 in case of interruptions of essential public services to the community

Switzerland
In general, the political system in Switzerland is characterized by the so-called militia-system, where civilian service tasks basically are carried out on a part-time basis. Currently,  not only the compulsory military service in the Swiss Armed Forces is backed on the militia-system, many political and civilian service duties are maintained by the militia secondary activity. For example, members of cantonal or federal parliaments or governments in general engage on part-time basis.

Unlike to the organization of fire brigades in most countries as professional or voluntary fire departments, in Switzerland there are basically militia fire brigades, compulsory fire brigades with drafted members.

The duty in Swiss civil defense and protection institutions is mandatory for inhabitants as well.

United Kingdom
The British overseas territory of Pitcairn Islands, which has a population of about 50 and no income or sales tax, has a system of "public work" whereby all able-bodied people are required to perform, when called upon, jobs such as road maintenance and repairs to public buildings.

Former civil conscriptions

Belgium
To prevent a doctors strike the Belgium government, in April 1964, issued a civil mobilization order for hospital doctors and military doctors.

Czechoslovakia 
During the communist rule in Czechoslovakia the government announced a non-remunerated activity programme called Action Z (in Czech:  Akce Z )  for the population. Officially, it was a voluntary work, but in fact it was mandatory. The participation at the Action Z programme was documented and citizens who did not participate or whose participation was unsatisfactory, were threatened with consequences at their regular work.

East Germany
In East Germany, the officially volunteer Subbotnik service was de facto obligatory the population. With this service, the local communities helped in the maintenance of local infrastructure.

Greece
In Greece, the introduction of civil conscription, called "political mobilization", was made possible by law in 1974 and several governments have made use of it.

 The years 1979 - 1990
As early as 1979, bank employees and several times in the 1980s and 1990s employees of traffic and transport companies were obliged to perform work. 

 The debt crisis 2010 - 2014
Due to the Greek debt crisis from 2010 to 2014, certain professional groups were made subject to civil conscription in order to provide public services as a national interest. For example, truck drivers, employees of transport companies, employees of municipalities and teachers were obliged to perform at work.

 Abolition of civil conscription in 2015
Due to the fact, that civil conscription was very unpopular, the government under the ruling party Syriza abolished civil conscription in 2015.

 COVID-19 pandemic
Although civil conscription was abolished, the parliament again created a legal basis during the COVID-19 pandemic in Greece in 2020. Based on the new law, freelance doctors were required to serve in state hospitals in March 2021.

Nazi Germany
Apart from the use of forced labour under German rule during World War II for millions of people, the Nazi German government ordered compulsory work of the civilian population as well, as a part of Nazi labor market policy and to spread Nazi propaganda. As early as 1934 all students leaving school after 8 years were obliged to join the Landjahr (countryside year) for labour in agriculture. In addition to that it was compulsory for women until the age of 25 to serve the Pflichtjahr (compulsory year), which was basically in the field of housekeeping. Starting in 1935 the Reich Labour Service was mandatory for all male citizens.

Seychelles 
The National Youth Service (NYS)  was a youth service program implemented in 1981 by the government of Seychelles that lasted two years until 1991, when it was reduced to a period of one year. It was a formerly compulsory civil service and included traditional educational curriculum, political education and paramilitary training. The Seychellois opposition opposed the program on the grounds, that it allegedly indoctrinated young adults with the ruling Seychelles People's Progressive Front's socialist ideology and that it rarely allowed its participants to visit their families. This mandatory service was ceased in November 1998.

Slovakia
Due to the severe course of the COVID-19 pandemic in Slovakia, the state of emergency was declared in September 2020 by the government under the leadership of Slovak Prime Minister Igor Matovič. Among others legal rights, the government obliged medical personnel to work and to be transferred to other medical facilities. The right to strike was revoked.

Spain
In Spain, during an estado de alarma, the "state of alarm", the Spanish government can impose civil conscription. This state of emergency has been declared to conscript different professional groups since the end of Francoist Spain a few times:
 December 4, 2010 until  January 16, 2011, due to the Spanish air traffic controllers strike, air traffic control personnel was conscripted to fulfill their duties.
 March 14, 2020 until June 21, 2020, due to the COVID-19 pandemic in Spain to conscript medical personnel.

United Kingdom
Due to a labour shortage between December 1943 and March 1948, because of World War II and the aftermath, the British government started to draft civil conscripts, the so-called Bevin Boys, for the work in coal mines.

See also
Community service
Corvée
Himeyuri Students
National service
Workfare

References

Conscription